The Man Who Thought Life is a 1969 Danish science fiction  thriller film directed by Jens Ravn and based upon the 1938 novel by Valdemar Holst. It was entered into the 1969 Cannes Film Festival.

Cast
 John Price as Steinmetz
 Preben Neergaard as Max Holst
 Lotte Tarp as Susanne
 Lars Lunøe as Robert
 Kirsten Rolffes as Værtinden
 Ejner Federspiel as Butleren
 Elith Pio as Overlægen
 Jørgen Beck as Kriminalassistenten
 Tove Maës as Kasserersken

References

External links

1969 films
1960s science fiction thriller films
Danish science fiction thriller films
1960s Danish-language films
Danish black-and-white films
ASA Filmudlejning films